City Constituency was a constituency represented in the Legislative Council of Singapore from 1951 until 1955. The constituency was formed in 1951 from carving out from Municipal South-West Constituency and in 1955, it was split into Havelock, Stamford, Tanjong Pagar and Telok Ayer constituencies.

Legislative Council member

Elections

Elections in the 1950s

References 

Singaporean electoral divisions